Michal Macho (born January 17, 1982) is a Slovak former professional ice hockey player who last played with HK Martin in the Slovak Extraliga. He was selected by the San Jose Sharks in the 6th round (183rd overall) of the 2000 NHL Entry Draft.

Career statistics

Regular season and playoffs

International

References

External links

1982 births
Living people
BK Mladá Boleslav players
Buran Voronezh players
HC Košice players
HC Slovan Bratislava players
HK 2016 Trebišov players
San Jose Sharks draft picks
Worcester Sharks players
MHC Martin players
MHK Dolný Kubín players
Saryarka Karagandy players
Slovak ice hockey centres
Sportspeople from Martin, Slovakia
Slovak expatriate ice hockey players in the United States
Slovak expatriate ice hockey players in the Czech Republic
Slovak expatriate sportspeople in Kazakhstan
Expatriate ice hockey players in Kazakhstan
Slovak expatriate ice hockey players in Russia